Agnès Catherine Poirier (born 1975) is a French journalist, writer and broadcaster.

Early life
Born in Paris, she has lived and worked in London since the late 1990s, initially as a doctoral student at the London School of Economics.

Career
Poirier has written for Le Nouvel Observateur, Le Monde, the Italian  L'Espresso and her work in English has featured in The Guardian, The Times, the New Statesman, The New York Times, The Financial Times , The Independent on Sunday. She has been a UK correspondent for Libération, Le Figaro, Marianne, La Vie and L'Express. She is the author of several books in French and in English, translated in a dozen languages.

She has been a regular panel member of the British Broadcasting Corporation's Dateline London public affairs television discussion programme since 2000. She preselects British films for Cannes Film Festival .

Personal life
Poirier lives in Paris and London.

Bibliography

 
 Touché, A French woman's take on the English, 2006, Weidenfeld & Nicolson
 Le Modèle anglais, une illusion française, 14 September 2006, Alvik Editions, 
 Les Pintades à Londres, 2008 
 
 Left Bank: Art, Passion and the Rebirth of Paris 1940–1950, 8 March 2018, Bloomsbury Publishing, 
 "Notre-Dame, The Soul of France" 2020,  Oneworld Publications

See also
 France-UK relations

External links
 
 The Guardian Profile, The Guardian

1975 births
Living people
21st-century French women writers
21st-century French essayists
Alumni of the London School of Economics
French expatriates in England
French film critics
French women essayists
French women film critics
The New York Review of Books people
Sciences Po alumni
The Times people
Writers from Paris